Three Days is a 2014 South Korean action-thriller television series starring Park Yoochun, Son Hyun-joo, Park Ha-sun, Yoon Je-moon, So Yi-hyun, Jang Hyun-sung and Choi Won-young. It aired on SBS from March 5 to May 1, 2014 on Wednesdays and Thursdays at 9:55 p.m. for 16 episodes.

Inspired by the "real time" format of American series 24,  the narrative of Three Days is divided into three parts; Part 1: The Prelude, Part 2: The Showdown, and Part 3: Judgement, with each segment lasting for 72 hours.

Plot
The President of South Korea goes on holiday at a private villa. In the middle of the night, three gunshots are fired, and the president goes missing. His bodyguards, led by elite agent Han Tae-kyung, have three days to find the president and escort him safely back to the Blue House.

Three Days follows the intertwining fates of those sworn to protect the president, the president himself, his political staff, and the true power players in the shadows who decide whether he lives or dies.

Cast

Main characters
Park Yoochun as Han Tae-kyung
Nam Da-reum as young Tae-kyung
Son Hyun-joo as Lee Dong-hwi, President of South Korea
Park Ha-sun as Yoon Bo-won, police constable
So Yi-hyun as Lee Cha-young, SWAT team agent
Choi Won-young as Kim Do-jin
Yoon Je-moon as Shin Kyu-jin, chief presidential secretary
Jang Hyun-sung as Ham Bong-su, chief of the Presidential Security Service

Supporting characters

Staff of PSS
Ahn Gil-kang as Kim Sang-hee, Chief Director of Presidential Bodyguards
Kwon Min as Chief of the Situation Center
Kim Jung-hak as Moon Sung Min
Jo Young-jin as Blue House's Senior Civil Affairs
Yoon Seo-hyun as president's bodyguard
Kim Min-jae as Hwang Yoon Jae
Park Hyuk-kwon as Goo Ja Kwang
Jin Hyuk as Park Sang Gyu
Kim Hak-sun as Kim Hyo Sun
Seo Gun-woo as president's bodyguard
Joo Yung-ho as president's bodyguard
Kim Han-joon as president's bodyguard
Yoo Sang-jae as team leader of 2nd support staff reporting to the president
Yoo Jung-rae as Jung Rae

Extended Cast
David No as Ahn Kyung-nam
Dong Ha as Killer Yo-han
Lee Dae-yeon as Han Ki Joon (Han Tae Kyung's father)
Go In-bum as Yang Dae Ho
Kim Hyung-kyu as Yo Han
Lee Jae-yong as Choi Ji Hoon
Min Sung-wook as Oh Young Min
Jo Hee-bong as Lee Jae Woong
Jung Won-joong as Kwon Jae Yun
Lee Kyung-young as Kim Ki Bum
Jang Dong-jik as Major Ri Chul Kyu
Jun Jin-ki as Hwang Kyung Joon
Nam Myung-ryul as Min Hyun Ki
Kim Jong-soo as Byun Tae Hoon
Jung Wook as Kwon Yong Han
Park Sung-hoon as Lee Dong Sung
Lee Hyun-wook as Kim Do Jin's right-hand man
Ha Jun as Presidential guard
Jang In-sub as Policeman	
Jin Seon-kyu as Tattoo man killer
Kim Hak-sun
Woo Sang-wook
Ahn Ji-hye
Kim Myung-jin
Nam Moon-chul
Heo Joon-suk
Son Jong-hak
Baek Seo-bin
Lee Jae-won
Kim Tae-yoon

Production 
Three Days initially encountered pre-production difficulties. After negotiations stalled between production company Golden Thumb Pictures and broadcaster SBS, on December 4, 2013, SBS removed the drama from its February 2014 programming slate. Five days later, SBS changed its mind and placed the drama back in its original airing schedule. But lead actor Park Yoochun, who had already re-adjusted his shooting schedule for the film Haemoo after the supposed cancellation of Three Days''' timeslot, found the schedules of those two projects overlapping, leaving his casting uncertain. On December 20, 2013, a press release confirmed that Park was still the lead actor, and that his scheduling problems had been resolved. Park then underwent training in fighting and defense skills for his role as a presidential bodyguard. He continued filming despite suffering a shoulder injury on set.

Screenwriter Kim Eun-hee (who previously penned Sign and Phantom'') had worked on the show's concept for over two years. Prior to filming, she had already written 6 episodes of the 16-episode series, in order to give the cast ample time to prepare and get into character.

The first script reading took place on November 13, 2013 at SBS Ilsan Production Center.

Ratings

Awards and nominations

International broadcast 
It aired in Malaysia on ONE TV ASIA via Astro Channel 393 with English, Chinese and Malay subtitles and later on Astro Shuang Xing via Channel 324 and Channel 307 (HD) starting April 12, 2015 at 7.00 PM.

It aired in Indonesia and Singapore on ONE TV ASIA.

It aired in Japan on cable channel KNTV on Saturdays at 8:00 p.m. beginning August 9, 2014.

It aired in Thailand on PPTV HD on Mondays & Tuesdays at 9:30 p.m. from June 22 to August 18, 2015.

References

External links
 
Three Days at Golden Thumb Pictures
Three Days at C-JeS Entertainment

2014 South Korean television series debuts
2014 South Korean television series endings
Seoul Broadcasting System television dramas
Korean-language television shows
South Korean action television series
South Korean thriller television series
Television series by C-JeS Entertainment
Television shows written by Kim Eun-hee